The rufous-margined antwren (Herpsilochmus rufimarginatus) is an insectivorous bird in the antbird family Thamnophilidae.
It is found in Argentina, Brazil, and Paraguay.
Its natural habitats are subtropical or tropical dry forest, subtropical or tropical moist lowland forest, subtropical or tropical moist montane forest, and subtropical or tropical dry shrubland.

The rufous-margined antwren was described by the Dutch zoologist Coenraad Jacob Temminck in 1822 and given the binomial name Myiothera rufimarginatus. It is now placed in the genus Herpsilochmus which was introduced by the German ornithologist Jean Cabanis in 1847.
The specific epithet rufimarginatus is from the Latin rufus "rufous" and marginatus "marginned" or "bordered". The rufous-margined antwren (Herpsilochmus frater) was formerly treated as a subspecies of the rusty-winged antwren, collectively called the rufous-winged antwren.

References

External links
Xeno-canto: audio recordings of the rufous-winged antwren

Birds of Brazil
Birds of the Atlantic Forest
rufous-margined antwren
Taxonomy articles created by Polbot